Defluviimonas aestuarii is a Gram-negative and strictly aerobic, moderately halophilic and non-motile bacterium from the genus of Defluviimonas which has been isolated from marine tidal flat sediments from the South Sea in Korea.

References

External links
Type strain of Defluviimonas aestuarii at BacDive -  the Bacterial Diversity Metadatabase

Rhodobacteraceae
Bacteria described in 2013